Francesca Isabel Natividad (February 13, 1948 – September 24, 2022), known professionally as Kitten Natividad, was a Mexican-American film actress and exotic dancer. She was noted for her 44-inch (112 cm) bust, and appearances in cult films made by her ex-partner, director Russ Meyer.

Early years
Natividad was born on February 13, 1948, in Ciudad Juárez, Chihuahua State, Mexico. She was the eldest of nine children. Natividad did not speak English until she was 10 years old. At that time, her mother married a U.S. citizen and they moved to Texas. Natividad attended Ysleta High School in El Paso, where she was her senior class president.

After moving to California, Natividad worked as both a maid and a cook for Stella Stevens, and then as a key-punch operator for IBM, before eventually turning to go-go dancing to make ends meet. At this time, she adopted the stage name of "Kitten" Natividad, which came from her shyness. In 1969, at the age of 21 years, she had her first breast implant surgery in Tijuana (where it was legal) on the advice of her agent.

Career
Natividad, by then known mainly as Kitten, was introduced to Russ Meyer by fellow dancer Shari Eubank, a performer in Meyer's 1975 film Supervixens. Meyer hired her to narrate his movie Up! In it, she was shown sitting nude in a tree, quoting the poetry of Hilda Doolittle, and acting as a Greek chorus to the nonsensical action. Meyer was so impressed he wanted her to star in his next feature, Beneath the Valley of the Ultra-Vixens, one of several collaborations between Meyer and film critic Roger Ebert. Meyer paid for a second breast enhancement and voice lessons to eliminate her accent. Due to the tragic results of her breast enhancement surgeries she deeply regretted what she was talked into doing. She left her husband for Meyer during the filming, and they lived together as a couple for most of the next 15 years.

After this, Natividad moved into pornographic modeling, mainly doing glamour or girl-girl shoots with the likes of Candy Samples, Uschi Digard, and Patty Plenty. The appearances increased her dancing income many times over. She incorporated a giant champagne glass into her act, similar to such as Lili St. Cyr had used, accompanied by the Bobby Darin hit "Splish Splash". She appeared as a guest on The Dating Game, one of a number of game shows that Chuck Barris produced.

During the 1980s, Natividad began appearing in pornographic productions, initially limiting her performances to appearing topless. Eventually, however, she graduated to engaging in hardcore performances, usually with younger men and women. She has had backlash from burlesque performers because she did hardcore videos. She also founded the private photo and video studio called "The Kitten Klub". Her website later closed. She famously appeared as a stripper at the bachelor party held by Sean Penn to celebrate his 1985 marriage to Madonna, having portrayed a stripper the year before in The Wild Life, a movie starring Sean’s brother Christopher.

In 2001, Natividad starred in the cult film comedy The Double-D Avenger, directed by William Winckler, and in it, she was reunited with fellow Russ Meyer "repertory" stars Haji (from Meyer's Faster Pussycat! Kill! Kill!) and Raven De La Croix from Meyer's film Up! In The Double-D Avenger, Kitten Natividad played Chastity Knott, a woman who becomes a busty costumed crime fighter.
The pornographic website Brazzers was negotiating her return to hardcore performances.

In pop culture 
 Natividad appeared on The Gong Show in the late 1970s and on The $1.98 Beauty Show, both of which, like The Dating Game, were produced by Chuck Barris. (Barris hosted The Gong Show; Rip Taylor hosted The $1.98 Beauty Show; and Jim Lange hosted The Dating Game.)
 She appeared in a 1980s music video for Mitch Ryder's version of the song "When You Were Mine", which was written and composed by Prince.
 In August 2006, Natividad appeared in a Playboy layout, "The History of Bikinis".

Personal life
In October 1999, Natividad underwent double-mastectomy surgery for treatment of breast cancer. After her breasts were removed, it was discovered that the silicone that had been used in her implants when she had undergone her 1969 surgery was of an industrial grade rather than a surgical grade. She subsequently underwent corrective surgery, and this brought her closer to the size that her fans remembered her having been.

As of early August 2016, she was living alone with a pit bull and three cats, all of which were featured in the 2005 documentary movie Pornstar Pets, and she continued to support herself with sales of her porn videos and phone sex. She appeared in the Adam Rifkin independent feature A Night at the Golden Eagle; according to her, Rifkin remembered recognizing her when their cars were both stopped at the same stoplight 25 years earlier.

Death
Natividad died from kidney failure at Cedars Sinai Hospital in Los Angeles on September 24, 2022, aged 74. She was survived by her sister Eva, her mother, four nephews and a niece.

Selected filmography
Kitten Natividad has appeared in more than 65 films and video productions. Career highlights and major studio features include:

 1972: The New Centurions
 1976: Up!
 1979: Beneath the Valley of the Ultra-Vixens
 1976: Deep Jaws
 1980: Airplane! (uncredited) 
 1982: Airplane II: The Sequel (uncredited)
 1982: The Best Little Whorehouse in Texas (uncredited)
 1983: My Tutor
 1984: Night Patrol
 1984: The Wild Life
 1985: Takin' It Off
 1985: Bodacious Ta Tas
 1985: An Evening with Kitten
 1986: The Tomb
 1987: Takin' It All Off
 1990: Another 48 Hrs.
 1990: 40 The Hard Way
 1993: Titillation 3
 1993: Buford's Beach Bunnies
 1996: United Trash
 1997: The 120 Days of Bottrop
 2001: The Double-D Avenger
 2001: Night at the Golden Eagle
 2009: Nightbeats
 2017: Fags in the Fast Lane
 2019: 70 the Hard Way

References

External links 

 Official site
 
 
 

1948 births
2022 deaths
American female erotic dancers
American erotic dancers
American female adult models
American pornographic film actresses
American film actresses
Mexican emigrants to the United States
American burlesque performers
American vedettes
Hispanic and Latino American female models
Hispanic and Latino American pornographic film actors
Mexican female adult models
Mexican erotic dancers
Mexican pornographic film actresses
Mexican film actresses
People from Ciudad Juárez
20th-century Mexican dancers
21st-century Mexican dancers
20th-century Mexican actresses
21st-century Mexican actresses
20th-century American dancers
21st-century American dancers
20th-century American actresses
21st-century American actresses